Karl-Heinz Grzeschuchna (born 8 June 1943) is a German rower. He won a gold medal at the 1966 World Rowing Championships in Bled with the men's coxed four.

References

1943 births
Living people
German male rowers
World Rowing Championships medalists for East Germany